Dan Lewis (birth unknown – death unknown) was a Welsh professional rugby league footballer who played in the 1900s and 1910s. He played at representative level for Wales and Welsh League XIII, and at club level for Merthyr Tydfil and York, as a forward (prior to the specialist positions of), during the era of contested scrums.

International honours
Dan Lewis won a cap for Wales while at Merthyr Tydfil in the 39-18 victory over England at Eugene Cross Park, Ebbw Vale on Saturday 9 April 1910, and represented Welsh League XIII while at Merthyr Tydfil in the 14-13 victory over Australia at Penydarren Park, Merthyr Tydfil on Tuesday 19 January 1909.

References

External links

Merthyr Tydfil RLFC players
Place of birth missing
Place of death missing
Rugby league forwards
Wales national rugby league team players
Welsh League rugby league team players
Welsh rugby league players
Year of birth missing
Year of death missing
York Wasps players